Nine Percent (Chinese: 百分九少年; commonly stylized as NINE PERCENT) was a nine-member Chinese boy group formed by the survival show Idol Producer by iQIYI on April 6, 2018. The group was scheduled to promote for 18 months since formation.

Nine Percent rocked the Chinese entertainment industry in the few months they existed, experiencing a truly meteoric rise in popularity in the short time since the group’s formation. Fans of Nine Percent are estimated to have generated some 20 million RMB of Idol Producer’s revenue, with their debut album To The Nines earning more than 10 million RMB in China alone.

History
In 2018, Nine Percent (百分九少年) was formed from the survival show Idol Producer where the audience voted for the group's members. This ran from January 19 to April 6, 2018.

The group consisted of Cai Xukun (蔡徐坤), Chen Linong(陈立农), Fan Chengcheng (范丞丞), Justin (黄明昊), Lin Yanjun (林彦俊), Zhu Zhengting (朱正廷), Wang Ziyi (王子异), Xiao Gui (小鬼), and You Zhangjing (尤长靖).

First public performance and Debut with To the Nines 
After their debut stage in Idol Producer, they were then sent to Los Angeles for further training for half a month. Rodney Jerkins and Christopher Scott were two of their mentors, and they debuted with the 8 original songs during the second half of the competition, they held their first public performance in Shanghai in May with those songs.

On May 25, their official Weibo account announced that the members decided to name their fans "Nine's" and chose to be represented by the colours PANTONE325C   and PANTONE7456C .

They released their debut album To the Nines on November 12, 2018. They gave their first live performance at M space, a music venue in Beijing, to a group of 500 fans. The show was also live-streamed through the online platforms hosted by the Tencent Music Entertainment Group, including QQ Music, Kuwo and Kugou, which racked up over 15 million clicks. Within 3 days of the album being released it made almost 8 million yuan ($1.15 million) in sales through Tencent Music's online platforms selling for 20 yuan a download. The album also accumulated almost a million digital sales and landed at No. 2 on the Billboard China V chart.

2019: More Than Forever, and disbandment 

On September 23, 2019, the poster for the group's farewell show, More Than Forever, was dropped. The documentary showed the members prepare themselves for their final performance with each member having a chance to express their feelings after being together for 18 months and how they felt fortunate for getting to know each other. A day later on September 24 the group's new album, also named , was announced to come out on September 26 and will feature 9 solo tracks from each of the members.

On October 6, 2019, the group officially disbanded and on October 12, they held their farewell concert in Guangzhou. The livestream of the concert, which was made available to iQiyi VIP members, garnered 400 million in likes and more than 1.2 million views at one point. On Chinese social media, approximately 80,000 iQiyi VIP members participated in the concert's online activity while 8 topics related to the concert made it onto Weibo's - China's version of Twitter - list of trending topics, which in total gathered an accumulated readership of over 1 billion.

Controversy over lack of promotions 
In August and October 2018, many netizens criticized iQIYI for failing to provide more opportunities to some of the members of the group. The lack of group performances and members' tendency to work on their own led fans to suspect the group Nine Percent might exist in name only. This caused some to believe that the group's company lacked a vision for the future in terms of music, instead of producing music, individual members had been busy with their own activities such as filming TV series and appearing on variety shows. Even presenter He Jiong joked on an episode of Who's the Murderer that it's very common in China for boy bands to spend a lot of time appearing on food shows.

Despite being a phenomenal success, the group was mocked for lacking a sense of unity as only a few members, like Cai Xukun and Chen Linong, earned noticeable fame with a loyal fanbase. Most fans blamed the company, Idol Century, for their poor management of the group, 55% of Idol Century's shares are owned by iQiyi and had only been around for a while after  Idol Producer had ended. Fans criticised the company for immediately holding fan meetings and concerts for the group with the same tracks from the show, without releasing a new album.

A little after Nine Percent had debuted, Yuehua debuted their newest boy group NEXT (formerly known as NEX7) with members Zhu Zhengting, Fan Chengcheng and Justin which resulted in them being more involved in NEXT than in Nine Percent. According to an article from one of China's biggest social platforms, Weibo, it's said that the members were more like solo singers or actors than members of a group due to the lack of promotion Nine Percent received. Even in their final album More Than Forever it was pointed out that there were no songs sung by the members as a group, which led to there being more fans who liked only one or a few members of the group than there being fans who liked the group as a whole.

Discography

Studio albums

Singles

Other charted songs

Filmography

Television shows

Awards and nominations

Concerts and tours

Headlining concerts 

 THX with Love (2018)
 专辑分享会 (2018)
 More Than Forever Final Concert [限定的记忆] (2019)

Notes

References

External links

 
 

Idol Producer
Chinese boy bands
Mandopop musical groups
Chinese pop music groups
Chinese dance music groups
Mandarin-language singers
2018 establishments in China
Musical groups established in 2018
Idol Producer contestants